Georges Casolari (5 May 1941 – 7 October 2012) was a French footballer.

References

External links
 

Profile and stats

1941 births
2012 deaths
Footballers from Nice
French footballers
France international footballers
AS Monaco FC players
Ligue 1 players
Ligue 2 players
French sportspeople of Italian descent
Association football midfielders